The Turkish Basketball Cup, FIAT Turkish Basketball Cup for sponsorship consideration, is the Turkey men's professional basketball national cup tournament. It has been held and organised by the Turkish Basketball Federation since 1967. The tournament was on hiatus from 1973 to 1991.

Title holders 

 1966–67: Fenerbahçe
 1967–68: Altınordu
 1968–69: İTÜ
 1969–70: Galatasaray
 1970–71: İTÜ
 1971–72: Galatasaray
 1972–73: TED Ankara Kolejliler
 1973–91: Not held
 ......1992: Paşabahçe
 ......1993: Tofaş
 1993–94: Efes Pilsen
 1994–95: Galatasaray
 1995–96: Efes Pilsen
 1996–97: Efes Pilsen
 1997–98: Efes Pilsen
 1998–99: Tofaş
 1999–00: Tofaş
 2000–01: Efes Pilsen
 2001–02: Efes Pilsen
 2002–03: Ülker
 2003–04: Ülker
 2004–05: Ülker
 2005–06: Efes Pilsen
 2006–07: Efes Pilsen
 2007–08: Türk Telekom
 2008–09: Efes Pilsen
 2009–10: Fenerbahçe Ülker
 2010–11: Fenerbahçe Ülker
 2011–12: Beşiktaş Milangaz
 2012–13: Fenerbahçe Ülker
 2013–14: Pinar Karşıyaka
 2014–15: Anadolu Efes
 2016: Fenerbahçe 
 2017: Banvit
 2018: Anadolu Efes
 2019: Fenerbahçe Beko
 2020: Fenerbahçe Beko
 2021: Cancelled due to the COVID-19 pandemic.
 2022: Anadolu Efes
 2023:

Finals 

Source:

Performance by club 
Clubs in bold currently play in the top division.

See also 
 Men's
 Turkish Men's Basketball League
 Turkish Men's Basketball Cup
 Turkish Men's Basketball Presidential Cup

 Women's
Turkish Women's Basketball League
Turkish Women's Basketball Cup
Turkish Women's Basketball Presidential Cup

Sources
 Durupınar, Mehmet. Türk Basketbolunun 100 yıllık tarihi, (2009). Efes Pazarlama ve Dağıtım Ticaret A.Ş.

References

External links
Official site 
Turkish Basketball Federation Official Website 
Official BSL Stats

 
1967 establishments in Turkey
Basketball cup competitions in Europe
Basketball cup competitions in Turkey